Art Bug, launched in 2001 by Jaelle Ang, an architect and artist by training, is a Singapore institution in art education. With focus on encouraging creative expression and critical thinking, Art Bug have provided art training to over 70 kindergartens and schools in Singapore. Art Bug became a part Singapore Cerebral Education Group in 2011. Its headquarters are in Singapore and Beijing.

References

Visual arts education